Brzoza may refer to the following places in Poland:
Brzoza, Lower Silesian Voivodeship (south-west Poland)
Brzoza, Bydgoszcz County in Kuyavian-Pomeranian Voivodeship (north-central Poland)
Brzoza, Toruń County in Kuyavian-Pomeranian Voivodeship (north-central Poland)
Brzoza, Piotrków County in Łódź Voivodeship (central Poland)
Brzoza, Wieluń County in Łódź Voivodeship (central Poland)
Brzoza, Krotoszyn County in Greater Poland Voivodeship (west-central Poland)
Brzoza, Szamotuły County in Greater Poland Voivodeship (west-central Poland)
Brzoza, Lubusz Voivodeship (west Poland)

See also
Brzóza
Brzóza Królewska
Brzóza Stadnicka